Esmé Stuart, 2nd Duke of Richmond, 5th Duke of Lennox (2 November 164910 August 1660) was the infant son and heir of James Stewart, 1st Duke of Richmond, 4th Duke of Lennox (1612–1655), of Cobham Hall in Kent, by his wife Mary Villiers (1622–1685), only daughter of George Villiers, 1st Duke of Buckingham.

His father, who had been a loyal supporter of King Charles I during the Civil War, died in 1655, and Esmé and his mother went into exile in France. He died of smallpox in 1660, aged 10, in Paris, when his titles passed to his first-cousin Charles Stewart, 3rd Duke of Richmond, 6th Duke of Lennox (1638–1672).

Monument
He was buried on 4 September 1660 in Westminster Abbey, in the Richmond Vault in the Henry VII Chapel (that king formerly having been Earl of Richmond) above which survives his simple monument comprising a black obelisk set against a wall and standing on four small skulls, surmounted by an urn containing his heart. On the plinth is an incised ducal coronet and the letters "ES RL" (for Esme Stuart, Richmond, Lennox). The Latin inscription may be translated as:
Sacred to his memory. In this urn is enclosed the heart, while below rests the body, of the most illustrious Duke, Esme Stuart. Let him who seeks his parentage know that he inherited from his father James, firstly Duke of Lennox and then of Richmond and Lennox, the same title and rank, while from his mother Mary, only daughter of George, Duke of Buckingham, he derived his life and spirit, which afterwards he breathed out at Paris in the 11th year of his age on 14 (sic, should be 10) day of the month of August, in the year of man's salvation 1660.

References

|-

1649 births
1660 deaths
202
105
Esme Stewart
Lord Chamberlains of Scotland
Esme Stewart, 2nd Duke of Richmond
17th-century Scottish peers
Deaths from smallpox
Barons Clifton
Royalty and nobility who died as children